The Volkswagen ID. Buggy is an electric dune buggy concept revealed by German automobile manufacturer Volkswagen at the 2019 Geneva International Motor Show.

Overview

The Volkswagen ID. Buggy concept was revealed at the Geneva International Motor Show on March 7, 2019 in Geneva, Switzerland. It is a retro-styled 2-seat, roofless, and doorless electric dune buggy, inspired by other Volkswagen Beetle-based dune buggies from the 1960s such as the Meyers Manx. The ID. Buggy was designed by Volkswagen's head designer Klaus Zyciora.

Specifications

Technical specifications
The Volkswagen ID. Buggy concept is built on Volkswagen's MEB platform for electric vehicles. It uses a 62 kWh lithium-ion battery pack and two axle-mounted motors with a total output of 201 horsepower,  of torque, and a 0- time of 7.2 seconds. The ID. The ID.

Exterior
The Volkswagen ID. Buggy, designed for off-roading, is finished in a waterproof fern green paint, uses 18-inch rims with BF Goodrich All-Terrain TA tires, a rear targa bar, and two steel tow hooks on the front and rear bumpers for the event the vehicle gets stuck in mud or sand.

Interior
The interior of the Volkswagen ID. Buggy has two seats and—like its exterior—is waterproof, as the vehicle lacks both a roof and doors.

References

Electric concept cars
ID. Buggy
Retro-style automobiles